Diznab (also Romanized as Dīznāb; also known as Diznāh) is a village in Mehranrud-e Jonubi Rural District, in the Central District of Bostanabad County, East Azerbaijan Province, Iran. At the 2006 census, its population was 202, in 46 families.

References 

Populated places in Bostanabad County